New Mexico Road 599 (NM 599) is a  state highway in northern Santa Fe County, New Mexico, United States. The divided highway expressway is also known as the Veterans Memorial Highway and the Santa Fe Relief Route; and both names are used on road signs. The latter name alludes to the highway's original purpose of bypassing the urbanized areas of Santa Fe and thereby relieving it from shipments of hazardous waste. It passes through less densely developed terrain in and around the northwestern boundary of the municipality.

Route description

(From the intersection the road heads east as Aveneda del Sur. NM 14 heads north as a divided highway to a diamond interchange with Interstate 25/U.S. Route 85 [I-25/US 85] and then on to Santa Fe. NM 14 heads south [initially as a divided highway] through Madrid and several other smaller communities to eventually end at Interstate 40.)

From its southern terminus NM 599 heads very briefly west to East I-25 Frontage Road before turning northwest. (East I-25 Frontage Road heads north toward the Santa Fe County/NM 599 RailRunner station.) North of the freeway, NM 599 briefly enters La Cienega, a census-designated place, and crosses West I-25 Frontage Road, which provides access to a horse racetrack (formerly known as Downs at Santa Fe).

Next along the NM 599 is a diamond interchange with Jaguar Drive (Exit 2), that is located directly east of the Santa Fe Municipal Airport. (This interchange was added in 2015, years after the construction of the original highway, and, while it is directly east of the airport, the roadway does not yet continue west beyond the interchange.) Continuing north, and to the west of some of the Santa Fe's newer neighborhoods, the highway returns to a  speed limit before it approaches the remaining traffic light controlled intersection on the route at Airport Road (formerly State Route 284, now Santa Fe County Road 56). The Santa Fe Municipal Airport is accessed by heading west on Airport Road.

Northeast of the river NM 599 gains a western frontage road. Continuing northeast the expressway begins a long moderate climb through rolling terrain with grasses and juniper shrubs punctuated by mostly light residential development, as the road follows (at a distance) Santa Fe's northwestern boundary, until it reaches a dumbbell interchange (Exit 6) with South Meadows Drive (CR 62). While South Meadow drive does not yet continue northwest beyond the interchange, it provides a connection with CR 62, which originally crossed NM 599, just northeast of the newer interchange. Continuing its northeasterly course, and its climb through rolling hills, the expressway reaches an intersection with Via Veteranos. (Northwest of this junction, the West Frontage Road was built to allow for this intersection to eventually be replaced by a diamond interchange.) Still further northeast along the route is the diamond interchange (unnumbered exit) with Camino La Tierra (north) and Paseo Nopal (south). The West Frontage Road ends at Camino La Tierra.

Beyond the Camino La Tierra/Paseo Nopal interchange, the expressway assumes a more east–northeasterly course, re-enters the city limits of Santa Fe, and passes through largely open space (that is projected to be developed). About  along this section is a T intersection with Miranda Road, which only connects with the southbound lanes of NM 599. After an intersection with Camino De Las Montoyas the route turns to the south–southeast and reaches its highest point at a diamond interchange (unnumbered exit) with Ridgetop Road. Less than a mile later, after turning to the southeast, NM 599 reaches its northern terminus at a trumpet interchange with the U.S. Route 84/U.S. Route 285 (US 84/US 285) freeway, which is part of the Camino Real de Tierra Adentro. (US 84/US 285 heads north out of Santa Fe to Pojoaque and Española and heads south to connect with I-25/US 85, immediately south of the Santa Fe city limits.)

Design
Functionally, NM 599 is an expressway by being a divided highway with no driveway access. Instead, local access is provided by linked frontage roads or by way of other connecting roads. There are four diamond interchanges and a dumbbell interchange along the route, as well as a trumpet interchange at its northern terminus. (The diamond interchange with I-25/US 85 was originally constructed as a partial cloverleaf interchange, but was rebuilt as a diamond interchange in 2009 as part of the construction of the Santa Fe County/NM 599 RailRunner station in the median of I-25/US 85.) A few of the local highways that cross it at intervals are controlled by stop signs (but none on NM 599 itself) or traffic lights near the southern end of the route. Upgrades to the expressway are a consideration being undertaken by the New Mexico Department of Transportation's NM 599 Corridor Study.

History
The NM 599 is significant as part of the road network traversed by vehicles transporting radioactive waste from Los Alamos National Laboratory (LANL) north of Santa Fe to the Waste Isolation Pilot Project (WIPP) in southern New Mexico (near Carlsbad). Much of the funding for construction of the route was supplied by the United States Department of Energy so that WIPP-bound waste from LANL would not have to pass through the center of Santa Fe. However, most of the traffic on the road is general public use and has nothing to do with WIPP waste, which is moved only at infrequent intervals in special convoys. Construction of the expressway took place over a period of several years in the 1990s and was completed in November 2000.

Major intersections

See also

 List of state roads in New Mexico

References

External links

 
 Road 599 on Steve Riner's New Mexico Highway Page

599
Expressways in the United States
Transportation in Santa Fe County, New Mexico